Bikini Atoll ( or ; Marshallese: , , meaning "coconut place"), sometimes known as Eschscholtz Atoll between the 1800s and 1946 is a coral reef in the Marshall Islands consisting of 23 islands surrounding a   central lagoon. After the Second World War, the atoll's inhabitants were forcibly relocated in 1946, after which the islands and lagoon were the site of 23 nuclear tests by the United States until 1958.

Three families were resettled on Bikini island in 1970, totaling about 100 residents, but scientists found dangerously high levels of strontium-90 in well water in May 1977, and the residents were carrying abnormally high concentrations of caesium-137 in their bodies. They were evacuated again in 1980. The atoll is occasionally visited today by divers and a few scientists, and is occupied by a handful of caretakers.

Etymology 

The island's English name is derived from the German colonial name Bikini given to the atoll when it was part of German New Guinea. The German name is transliterated from the Marshallese name for the island, "Pik" meaning "plane surface" and "Ni" meaning "coconut tree", or surface of coconuts.

Culture 

Bikini islanders' traditional lifestyle was based on cultivating plants and eating shellfish and fish. They were skilled boatbuilders and navigators, sailing the two-hulled proa to and from islets around Bikini and other atolls in the Marshall Islands. They were relatively isolated and had developed a society bound by extended family association and tradition. Every lagoon was led by a king and queen, with a following of chieftains and chief women who constituted a ruling caste.

Japan occupied the islands starting in 1914. The islanders worked the copra plantations under the watchful eye of the Japanese, who took a portion of the sales. Chiefs could retain as much as $20,000 per year, and the remainder was distributed to the workers. The Marshall islanders took pride in extending hospitality to one another, even distant relatives.

Clothing and dress 

Women wore two mats about a yard square each, made by weaving pandanus and hibiscus leaves together and belted around the waist. Children were usually naked. Christian missionaries from Oahu arrived in the late 19th century and influenced the islanders' notions of modesty. They introduced a dress for women which was a long, wide, loose-fitting gown with long sleeves and a high neck, intended to cover as much skin as possible. The dress is called , from the name of the Hawaiian island of Oahu.

It is customary to remove one's shoes or sandals when taking a seat at someone's home. Marshallese women traditionally cover their shoulders and thighs as well. Women generally wear cotton muumuus or similar clothing that covers most of the body. Personal health is not often discussed except within the family, and women are especially private about female-related health issues, although they are willing to talk about their breasts.

Marshall island women swim in muumuus which are made of a fine polyester that quickly dries. In the capital of Majuro, revealing cocktail dresses are not considered appropriate for both islanders and guests. With the increasing influence of Western media, the younger generation wears shorts, though the older generation equates shorts with loose morals. T-shirts, jeans, skirts, and makeup are making their way to the islands via the media.

Land-based wealth 

The Bikini islanders continue to maintain land rights as the primary measure of wealth.

Each family is part of a clan (Bwij), which owns all land. The clan owes allegiance to a chief (Iroij). The chiefs oversee the clan heads (Alap), who are supported by laborers (Dri-jerbal). The Iroij control land tenure, resource use and distribution, and settle disputes. The Alap supervise land maintenance and daily activities. The Dri-jerbal work the land including farming, cleaning, and construction.

The Marshallese society is matrilineal and land is passed down from generation to generation through the mother. Land ownership ties families together into clans. Grandparents, parents, grandchildren, aunts, uncles, and cousins form extended, close-knit family groups. Gatherings tend to become big events. One of the most significant family events is the first birthday of a child (kemem), which relatives and friends celebrate with feasts and song.

Payments made in the 20th century as reparations for damage to the Bikini Atoll and the islanders' way of life have elevated their income relative to other Marshall Island residents. It has caused some Bikini islanders to become economically dependent on the payments from the trust fund. This dependency has eroded individuals' interest in traditional economic pursuits like taro and copra production. The move also altered traditional patterns of social alliance and political organization. On Bikini, rights to land and land ownership were the major factor in social and political organization and leadership. After relocation and settlement on Kili, a dual system of land tenure evolved. Disbursements from the trust fund were based in part to land ownership on Bikini and based on current land tenure on Kili.

Before the residents were relocated, they were led by a local chief and under the nominal control of the Paramount Chief of the Marshall Islands. Afterward, they had greater interaction with representatives of the trust fund and the U.S. government and began to look to them for support.

Language 

Most Marshallese speak both the Marshallese language and at least some Spanish. Government agencies use Marshallese. One important word in Marshallese is "yokwe" which is similar to the Hawaiian "aloha" and means "hello", "goodbye" and "love".

Environment 

Bikini Atoll is part of the Ralik Chain (for "sunset chain") within the Marshall Islands.

Nuclear test site 

The United States detonated 23 nuclear devices between 1946 and 1958 at seven test sites on the reef, inside the atoll, in the air, and underwater. They had a combined fission yield of 42.2 Mt. The testing began with the Operation Crossroads series in July 1946. The residents initially accepted resettlement voluntarily to Rongerik Atoll, believing that they would be able to return home within a short time. However, Rongerik could not produce enough food, and the islanders starved. They could not return home, so they were relocated to Kwajalein Atoll for six months before choosing to live on Kili Island, a small island one-sixth the size of their home island. Some were able to return to Bikini Island in 1970; however, further testing revealed dangerous levels of strontium-90. The United States government established several trust funds which  covered medical treatment and other costs and paid about $550 annually to each individual.

Geography 

Some 74 kilometers northwest of the atoll is Wōdejebato, a probable shield volcano that is connected to it through a submarine ridge.

There are 23 islands in the Bikini Atoll; the islands of Bokonijien, Aerokojlol, and Namu were vaporized during the nuclear tests. The islands are composed of low coral limestone and sand.

Flora and fauna 

The islanders cultivated native foods including coconut, pandanus, papaya, banana, arrowroot, taro, limes, breadfruit, and pumpkin. A wide variety of other trees and plants are also present on the islands.

The islanders were skilled fishermen. They used fishing line made from coconut husk and hooks from sharpened sea shells. They used more than 25 methods of fishing. The islanders raised ducks, pigs, and chickens for food and kept dogs and cats as pets. Animal life in the atoll was severely affected by the atomic bomb testing. Existing land species include small lizards, hermit crabs, and coconut crabs. The islands are frequented by a wide variety of birds.

To allow vessels with a larger draft to enter the lagoon and to prepare for the atomic bomb testing, the United States used explosives to cut a channel through the reef and to blow up large coral heads in the lagoon. The underwater nuclear explosions carved large holes in the bottom of the lagoon that were partially refilled by blast debris. The explosions distributed vast amounts of irradiated, pulverized coral and mud across wide expanses of the lagoon and surrounding islands. , the atoll had recovered nearly 65% of the biodiversity that existed prior to radioactive contamination, but 28 species of coral appear to be locally extinct.

Climate 

The islands are hot and humid. The temperature on Bikini Atoll is  year-round. The water temperature is also  all year. The islands border the Pacific typhoon belt. The wet season is from May to December while the trade winds from January through May produce higher wave action.

Resident and non-resident population 

When the United States asked the islanders to relocate in 1946, 19 islanders lived elsewhere. The 167 residents, comprising about 40 families who lived on the atoll, moved to Rongerik Atoll. The islands were able to produce much less food than they had on Bikini, and there were far fewer fish in the waters. By early 1948, the people were close to starvation. U.S. investigators concluded they must be moved, and they were relocated to Kwajalein Atoll.

During WWII, the atoll had been occupied by Japanese troops, and American naval ships, ground artillery, and B-24 Liberator bombers attacked the island, killing many of the 8,000 soldiers. The islanders lived in tents adjacent to the concrete runway in use by the U.S. Navy for six months.
 
They were moved once again in November 1948 to Kili Island, when the population numbered 184. They were later given public lands on Ejit and a few families initially moved there to grow copra. In 1970, about 160 Bikini islanders returned to live on the atoll after they were reassured that it was safe. They remained for about 10 years until scientists found an 11-fold increase in the cesium-137 body burdens and determined that the island was not safe after all. The 178 residents were evacuated in September 1978 once again.

Since then a number of descendants have moved to Majuro (the Marshall Islands' capital), other Marshall Islands, and the United States. In 1999, there were 2,600 total individuals; 1,000 islanders living on Kiji, 700 in Majuro, 275 on Ejit, 175 on other Marshall Islands or atolls, and 450 in the United States. Of those, 81 were among those who left the atoll in 1946. In 2001, the population of the dispersed islanders was 2,800.

As of March 2016, there were 5,400 living Bikini islanders: 800 islanders living on Kili, 2,550 on Majuro, 300 on Ejit, 350 on other Marshall Islands, and 1,400 in the United States and other countries. Of that number, 25 lived on Bikini in 1946. The resident population of the atoll is currently 4–6 caretakers, including Edward Maddison, who lived on Bikini Island from 1985 to 2020. He died on March 29, 2020. His grandfather was one of the original residents relocated in 1947. He helped the U.S. Department of Energy with soil monitoring, testing cleanup methods, mapping the wrecks in the lagoon, and accompanying visitors on dives. He was also the divemaster of Bikini Atoll Divers. Maddison passed away in Majuro, Marshall Islands on March 29, 2020.

Government 

The Bikini islanders were historically loyal to a king, or Irojj. After the Marshall Islands separated from the United States in the Compact of Free Association in 1986, its constitution established a bicameral parliament. The upper house is only a consultative body. It consists of traditional leaders (Iroijlaplap), known as the Council of Irooj, who advise the lower house on traditional, cultural issues. , there are four members of the council.

The lower house or Nitijela consists of 33 senators elected by 24 electoral districts. Universal suffrage is available to all citizens 18 years of age and older. The 24 electoral districts correspond roughly to each Marshall Islands atoll. The lower house elects the president who, with the approval of the Nitijela, selects a cabinet from among members of the Nitijela.

Local government 

Four district centers in Majuro, Ebeye, Jaluit, and Wotje provide local government. Each district elects a council and mayor and may appoint local officials. The district centers are funded by the national government and by local revenues. There are two political parties. Elections are held every four years. In 2011 Nishma Jamore was elected mayor of the district representing the Bikini people. Council members are elected from two wards on Ejit Island (three seats) and Kili Island (12 seats).

U.S. liaison 

The local government works with a U.S. paid Liaison Officer for Bikini Atoll Local Government, Jack Niedenthal, who is acting Bikini/Kili/Majuro Projects Manager. He is also the Tourism Operations Manager and oversees Bikini Atoll Divers.

History 

Human beings have inhabited the Bikini Atoll for about 3,600 years. U.S. Army Corps of Engineers archaeologist Charles F. Streck, Jr., found bits of charcoal, fish bones, shells and other artifacts under  of sand. Carbon-dating placed the age of the artifacts at between 1960 and 1650 BC. Other discoveries on Bikini and Eneu island were carbon-dated to between 1000 BC and 1 BC, and others between AD 400 and 1400.

The first recorded sighting by Europeans was in September 1529 by the Spanish navigator Álvaro de Saavedra on board his ship La Florida when trying to return to New Spain, and was charted as Buenos Jardines (Good Gardens in Spanish). The Marshalls lacked the wealth to encourage exploration or mapping. The British captain Samuel Wallis chanced upon Rongerik and Rongelap atolls while sailing from Tahiti to Tinian. The British naval captains John Marshall and Thomas Gilbert partially explored the Marshalls in 1788.

The first Westerner to see the atoll in the mid-1820s was the Baltic German captain and explorer Otto von Kotzebue, sailing in service of the Russian Empire. He visited three times during 1816 and 1817. He named the atoll Eschscholtz Atoll after Johann Friedrich von Eschscholtz, the naturalist of von Kotzebue's ship. The Baltic Germans used the atoll to produce copra oil from coconuts, although contact with the native population was infrequent. The atoll's climate is drier than the more fertile southern Marshall Islands which produced more copra. Bikini islanders were recruited into developing the copra trade during the German colonial period.

Christian missionaries arrive 

Protestant missionaries from the American Board of Commissioners for Foreign Missions arrived on Ebon, in the southern Ralik Chain, in 1857. They first introduced the islanders to Christianity in 1857, which gradually displaced their native religion. They also encouraged the women to cover their breasts and adopt a more modest form of clothing.

Spanish–German Treaty of 1899 

The explosion in Havana Harbor of the battleship  served as an excuse for the initiation of the Spanish–American War in 1898. It resulted in Spain losing many of its remaining colonies; Cuba became nominally independent while the United States took possession of Puerto Rico and Spain's Pacific colonies of the Philippines and Guam. This left Spain with the remainder of the Spanish East Indies in the Pacific, about 6000 islands that were tiny and sparsely populated. After the loss of the administrative center of Manila, the minor islands became ungovernable and, after the entire loss of two Spanish fleets in 1898, indefensible.

The Spanish government sold the islands to Germany. The treaty was signed on 12 February 1899, by Spanish Prime Minister Francisco Silvela, and transferred the Caroline Islands, the Mariana Islands, Palau and other possessions to Germany. The islands were then placed under the control of German New Guinea.

Japanese occupation 

Bikini was captured along with the rest of the Marshall Islands by the Imperial Japanese Navy in 1914 during World War I and mandated to the Empire of Japan by the League of Nations in 1920. The Japanese administered the island under the South Seas Mandate, but mostly left local affairs in the hands of traditional local leaders until the start of World War II. At the outset of the war, the Marshall Islands suddenly became a strategic outpost for the Japanese. They built and manned a watchtower on the island, an outpost for the Japanese headquarters on Kwajalein Atoll, to guard against an American invasion of the islands.

World War II 

The islands remained relatively unscathed by the war until February 1944, when in a bloody battle, the American forces captured Kwajalein Atoll. At the battle's conclusion, there were only five surviving Japanese soldiers left on Bikini, and they chose to die by suicide rather than allow themselves to be captured.

For the U.S., the battle represented both the next step in its island-hopping march to Japan and a significant moral victory, as it was the first time the Americans had penetrated the "outer ring" of the Japanese Pacific sphere. For the Japanese, the battle represented the failure of the beach-line defense. Japanese defenses became prepared in depth, and the battles of Peleliu, Guam, and the Marianas proved far more costly to the U.S. The base became part of the vast US Naval Base Marshall Islands.

Residents relocated 

After World War II, the United States was engaged in a Cold War nuclear arms race with the Soviet Union to build bigger and more destructive bombs.

The nuclear weapons testing at Bikini Atoll program was a series of 23 nuclear devices detonated by the United States between 1946 and 1958 at seven test sites. The test weapons were detonated on the reef itself, on the sea, in the air and underwater with a combined fission yield of 42.2 Mt. The testing began with the Operation Crossroads series in July 1946. Shortly after World War II ended, President Harry S. Truman directed Army and Navy officials to secure a site for testing nuclear weapons on American warships. While the Army had seen the results of a land-based explosion, the Navy wanted to know the effect of a nuclear weapon on ships. They wanted to determine whether ships could be spaced at sea and in ports in a way that would make nuclear weapons ineffective against vessels.

Bikini was distant from both regular sea and air traffic, making it an ideal location. In February 1946, Navy Commodore Ben H. Wyatt, the military governor of the Marshall Islands, asked the 167 Micronesian inhabitants of the atoll to voluntarily and temporarily relocate so the United States government could begin testing atomic bombs for "the good of mankind and to end all world wars." After "confused and sorrowful deliberation" among the Bikinians, their leader, King Juda, agreed to the U.S. relocation request, announcing , which translates as "Everything is in God’s hands." Nine of the eleven family heads, or alaps, chose Rongerik as their new home.

In February, Navy Seabees helped them to disassemble their church and community house and prepare to relocate them to their new home. On 7 March 1946, the residents gathered their personal belongings and saved building supplies. They were transported  eastward on U.S. Navy landing ship 1108 to the uninhabited Rongerik Atoll, which was one-sixth the size of Bikini Atoll. No one lived on Rongerik because it had an inadequate water and food supply and due to deep-rooted traditional beliefs that the island was haunted by the Demon Girls of Ujae. The Navy left them with a few weeks of food and water which soon proved to be inadequate.

Nuclear testing program 

The weapons testing began with the Operation Crossroads series in July 1946. The Baker test's radioactive contamination of all the target ships was the first case of immediate, concentrated radioactive fallout from a nuclear explosion. Chemist Glenn T. Seaborg, the longest-serving chairman of the Atomic Energy Commission, called Baker "the world's first nuclear disaster." This was followed by a series of later tests that left the islands of the atoll contaminated with enough radioactivity, particularly caesium-137, to contaminate food grown in the soil.

Strategic Trust Territory 

In 1947, the United States convinced the United Nations to designate the islands of Micronesia a United Nations Strategic Trust Territory. This was the only trust ever granted by the U.N. The United States Navy controlled the Trust from a headquarters in Guam until 1951, when the United States Department of the Interior took over control, administering the territory from a base in Saipan. The directive stated that the United States should "promote the economic advancement and self-sufficiency of the inhabitants, and to this end shall... protect the inhabitants against the loss of their lands and resources..."

Despite the promise to "protect the inhabitants", from July 1946 through July 1947, the residents of Bikini Atoll were left alone on Rongerik Atoll and were starving for lack of food. A team of U.S. investigators concluded in late 1947 that the islanders must be moved immediately. Press from around the world harshly criticized the U.S. Navy for ignoring the people. Harold Ickes, a syndicated columnist, wrote "The natives are actually and literally starving to death."

Move to Kili Island 

In January 1948, Dr. Leonard Mason, an anthropologist from the University of Hawaii, visited Rongerik Atoll and was horrified at what he found. One resident of Rongerik commented,

Mason requested that food be brought to the islanders on Rongerik immediately along with a medical officer. The Navy then selected Ujelang Atoll for their temporary home and some young men from the Bikini Atoll population went ahead to begin constructing living accommodations. But U.S. Trust Authorities changed their mind. They decided to use Enewetak Atoll as a second nuclear weapons test site and relocated that atoll's residents to Ujelang Atoll instead and to the homes built for the Bikini Islanders.

In March 1948, 184 malnourished Bikini islanders were relocated again to Kwajalein Atoll. They were given tents on a strip of grass alongside the airport runway to live in. In June 1948, the Bikini residents chose Kili Island as a long-term home. The extremely small,  island was uninhabited and wasn't ruled by a paramount iroij, or king due to its size. It also lacks a coral reef. In June, the Bikini community chose two dozen men to accompany eight Seabees to Kili to begin construction of a village. They soon learned they could no longer fish the way they had on Bikini Atoll. Kili lacked the calm, protected, lagoon. Living on Kili Island effectively destroyed their culture that had been based on fishing and island-hopping canoe voyages to various islets around the Bikini Atoll. Kili did not provide enough food for the transplanted residents.

Failed resettlement 

After their relocation to Kili, the Bikini residents continued to suffer from inadequate food supplies. Kili is a small island without a lagoon, and most of the year it is exposed to  waves that make fishing and putting canoes out difficult. Starvation ensued. In 1949, the Trust Territory administration donated a  ship for transporting copra between Kili and Jaluit Atoll, but the ship was wrecked in heavy surf while delivering copra and other fruit.
The U.S. Trust Authorities airdropped food onto Kili. The residents were forced to rely on imported USDA rice and canned goods and had to buy food with their supplemental income.

During 1955 and 1956, ships dispatched by the U.S. Trust Territory continually experienced problems unloading food because of the rough seas around the island, leading to additional food shortages. The people once again suffered from starvation and the shortages increased in 1956. The U.S. suggested that some of the Bikini Islanders move to Jaluit where food was more readily available. A few people moved.

Three families moved there to produce copra for sale and other families rotated living there later on. Their homes on both Kili and Jaluit were struck by typhoons during 1957 and 1958, sinking their supply ship and damaging crops.

Return to Bikini Atoll 

In June 1968, based on scientific advice that the radiation levels were sufficiently reduced, President Lyndon B. Johnson promised the 540 Bikini Atoll family members living on Kili and other islands that they would be able to return to their home. The Atomic Energy Commission cleared radioactive debris from the island, and the U.S. Trust Territory was in charge of rebuilding structures and replanting crops on the atoll. But shortly afterward the Trust Territory ended regular air flights between Kwajalein Atoll and Bikini Atoll which seriously impeded progress. Coconut trees were finally replanted in 1972, but the AEC learned that the coconut crabs retained high levels of radioactivity and could not be eaten. The Bikini Council voted to delay a return to the island as a result.

Three extended families, eventually totaling about 100 people, moved back to their home island in 1972 despite the risk. But 10 years later, a team of French scientists performed additional tests on the island and its inhabitants. They found some wells were too radioactive for use and determined that the pandanus and breadfruit were also dangerous for human consumption. Urine samples from the islanders on Bikini Atoll showed low levels of plutonium-239 and plutonium-240. As a result, the Bikini community filed a federal lawsuit seeking a complete scientific survey of Bikini and the northern Marshall Islands. Inter-departmental squabbling over responsibility for the costs delayed the work for three years. Then in May 1977 scientists found dangerously high levels of strontium-90 in the well water exceeding the U.S. maximum allowed limits. In June, the Department of Energy stated that "All living patterns involving Bikini Island exceed Federal [radiation] guidelines for thirty-year population doses." Later that year scientists discovered an 11-fold increase in the caesium-137 body burdens in all of the people living on the atoll. In May 1978 officials from the U.S. Department of the Interior described the 75% increase in radioactive caesium-137 found as "incredible".

Women were experiencing miscarriages, stillbirths, and genetic abnormalities in their children. Researchers learned that the coral soil behaved differently from mainland soil because it contains very little potassium. Plants and trees readily absorb potassium as part of the normal biological process, but since caesium is part of the same group on the periodic table, it is absorbed by plants in a very similar chemical process. The islanders who unknowingly consumed contaminated coconut milk were found to have abnormally high concentrations of caesium in their bodies. The Trust Territory decided that the islanders had to be evacuated from the atoll a second time.

The islanders received US$75 million in damages in 1986 as part of a new Compact of Free Association with the U.S. and in 1988, another $90 million to be used specifically for radiological cleanup. In 1987, a few Bikini elders traveled to Eneu Island to reestablish old property lines. Construction crews began building a hotel, docks, and roads on Bikini, and installed generators, desalinators, and power lines. A packed coral and sand runway still exists on Eneu Island. The Bikini Atoll Divers was established to provide income. But in 1995, the council learned that the US Environmental Protection Agency standard required reducing radiation levels to 15 millirems, substantially less than the US Department of Energy standard of 100 millirems. This discovery significantly increased the potential cost of cleanup and stalled the effort.

Relocation to Kili Island 

As a result of the military use of the island and the failed resettlement, the islands are littered with abandoned concrete bunkers and tons of heavy equipment, vehicles, supplies, machines, and buildings. In September 1978, Trust Territory officials finally arrived to relocate the residents. The radiological survey of the northern Marshalls, compelled by the 1975 lawsuit, began only after the residents were removed and returned to Kili Island.

, the tiny  Kili Island supported about 600 residents who live in cinderblock houses. They must rely on contributions from a settlement trust fund to supplement what they produce locally. Each family receives one to two boxes of frozen chicken, two to four 51-lb (23 kilogram) bags of flour, and two to four bags of rice 2 to 3 times per year. The islanders operate several small stores out of their homes to supply nonperishable food items like salt, Tabasco, candy, and canned items. A generator provides electricity.

Children attend elementary school on Kili through eighth grade. Toward the end of the eighth grade, students must pass a standardized test to gain admission to attend public high school in Jaluit or Majuro.

Beginning in 2011 the resettled residents of Kili Island began to experience periods of ocean flooding during king tide. Ocean waves have covered portions of the island at least five times from 2011 to 2015, contaminating the wells on the island. The runway servicing the island is unusable during and after rains and ocean flooding because it becomes extremely muddy. In August 2015, the Bikini Council passed a resolution requesting assistance from US government to modify terms of the Resettlement Trust Fund for the People of Bikini to be used to relocate the population once again, this time outside of the Marshall Islands.

Trust funds and failed claims 

In 1975, when the islanders who had returned to Bikini Atoll learned that it wasn't safe, they sued the United States for $900 billion in USD, demanding a radiological study of the northern islands.

In 1975, the United States set up The Hawaiian Trust Fund for the People of Bikini, totaling $3 million. When the islanders were removed from the island in 1978, the U.S. added $3 million to the fund. The U.S. created a second trust fund, The Resettlement Trust Fund for the People of Bikini, containing $20 million in 1982. The U.S. added another $90 million to that fund to pay to clean up, reconstruct homes and facilities, and resettle the islanders on Bikini and Eneu islands.

In 1983, the U.S. and the Marshall islanders signed the Compact of Free Association, which gave the Marshall Islands independence. The Compact became effective in 1986 and was subsequently modified by the Amended Compact that became effective in 2004. It also established the Nuclear Claims Tribunal, which was given the task of adjudicating compensation for victims and families affected by the nuclear testing program. Section 177 of the compact provided for reparations to the Bikini islanders and other northern atolls for damages. It included $75 million to be paid over 15 years.

The payments began in 1987 with $2.4 million paid annually to the entire Bikini population, while the remaining $2.6 million is paid into The Bikini Claims Trust Fund. This trust is intended to exist in perpetuity and to provide the islanders a 5% payment from the trust annually.

The United States provided $150 million in compensation for damage caused by the nuclear testing program and their displacement from their home island.

On 5 March 2001 after years of deliberations, the Nuclear Claims Tribunal ruled against the United States for damages done to the islands and its people. The NCT awarded Bikini $278 million for loss of land use, finding the actions of the U.S. amounted to a "temporary taking" and made its award based on fair rental value for the period of denied use. The NCT made a further award of $251,500,000 for atoll rehabilitation to restore Bikini "to a safe and productive state."

However, the U.S. Congress has failed to fund the settlement. The only recourse is for the Bikini people to petition the U.S. Congress to fund the payment and fulfill this award. The United States Supreme Court turned down the islanders' appeal of the United States Court of Appeals decision that refused to compel the government to fund their claim. By 2001, of the original 167 residents who were relocated, 70 were still alive, and the entire population has grown to 2,800. Most of the islanders and their descendants lived on Kili, in Majuro, and in the United States.

The Hawaiian Trust Fund for the People of Bikini was liquidated as required by law in December 2006. The value of The Resettlement Trust Fund for the People of Bikini as of 31 March 2013 was approximately $82 million and The Bikini Claims Trust Fund was worth approximately $60 million. In 2006, each member of the trust received about $500 a year. In 2012, the trusts produced about US$6 to $8 million annually in investment income, and the trusts paid out less than US$15,000 per family each year in benefits, with little money left available for cleanup.

Representatives for the Bikini people expect this process to take many years and do not know whether the United States will honor the terms of the Compact of Free Association.

World Heritage Site 

Because the site bears direct tangible evidence of the nuclear tests conducted there amid the paradoxical tropical location, UNESCO determined that the atoll symbolizes the dawn of the nuclear age and named it a World Heritage Site on 3 August 2010.

Visitor access 

Bikini Atoll is open to visitors aboard vessels that are completely self-sufficient if they obtain prior approval. They must also pay for a diver and two local government council representatives to accompany them. The local representation is required to verify that visitors don't remove artifacts from the wrecks in the lagoon. Extensive research has been conducted to ensure the safety of visitors to the area, and to demonstrate the now low levels of radiation in and around Bikini Atoll.

Bikini Lagoon diving 

In June 1996, the Bikini Council authorized diving operations as a means to generate income for Bikini islanders currently and upon their eventual return. The Bikini Council hired dive guide Edward Maddison who had lived on Bikini Island since 1985 and Fabio Amaral, a Brazilian citizen at the time, as head divemaster and resort manager. The tours are limited to fewer than a dozen experienced divers a week, cost more than US$5,000, and include detailed histories of the nuclear tests. The operation brought in more than $500,000 during the season from May to October 2001.

On-shore facilities 

To accommodate the dive program and anglers, the Bikini Council built new air-conditioned rooms with private bathrooms and showers. They included verandas overlooking the lagoon. There was a dining facility that served American-style meals. The head chef Mios Maddison also prepared Marshallese dishes featuring fresh seafood. Only 12 visitors were hosted at one time. Because of the lingering contamination, all fruits and vegetables used for the Bikini Atoll dive and sport fishing operation were imported. In September 2007, the last of Air Marshall Islands' commuter aircraft ceased operations when spare parts could not be located and the aircraft were no longer airworthy. A half dozen divers and a journalist were stranded for a week on Bikini Island. The Bikini islanders suspended land-based dive operations beginning in August 2008. , Air Marshall Islands operates one Bombardier DHC-8-100 aircraft and two 19-seat Dornier 228.

Live aboard diving program 

In October 2010, a live-aboard, self-contained vessel successfully conducted dive operations. In 2011, the local government licensed the live-aboard operator as a provider of dive expeditions on the nuclear ghost fleet at Bikini Atoll. The dive season runs from May through October. Visitors are still able to land on the island for brief stays.

In early 2017, Master Liveaboards announced they would add Bikini Atoll to their list of destinations for technical divers using their vessel Truk Master with trips to the site commencing in May 2018 having been granted a license by the Bikini Council. In May 2021, as a result of ongoing business evaluation and pent up demand created by the COVID-19 pandemic, Master Liveaboards announced they would be adding an additional vessel alongside Truk Master to operate at Bikini Atoll from 2022 onwards.

Because the lagoon has remained undisturbed for so long, it contains a larger amount of sea life than usual, including sharks, which increases divers' interest in the area. The lagoon is immensely popular with divers and is regarded as among the top 10 diving locations in the world.

Dive visitors receive a history lesson along with the dive experience, including movies and complete briefings about each of the ships, their respective histories, and a tour of the island and the atoll. Divers are able to visit the USS Saratoga (CV-3), the second largest of only three aircraft carriers in the world that are accessible to scuba or closed circuit rebreather divers.

Sportfishing 

Bikini Island authorities opened sport fishing to visitors along with diving. Although the atomic blasts obliterated three islands and contaminated much of the atoll, after 50 years the coral reefs have largely recovered. Given the long-term absence of humans, the Bikini lagoon offers sportsmen one of the most pristine fishing environments in the world.

Shipwrecks 

Shipwrecks in the lagoon include the following:

  – aircraft carrier
  – battleship
  – battleship
  – attack transport
  – attack transport
  – destroyer
  – destroyer
  – submarine
  – submarine
  – battleship
  – light cruiser

Current habitable state 

In 1998 an IAEA advisory group, formed in response to a request by the Government of the Marshall Islands for an independent international review of the radiological conditions at Bikini Atoll, recommended that Bikini Island should not be permanently resettled under the present radiological conditions.

The potential to make the island habitable has substantially improved since then. A 2012 assessment from Lawrence Livermore National Laboratory found that caesium-137 levels are dropping considerably faster than anyone expected. Terry Hamilton, scientific director of Lawrence Livermore National Laboratory's Marshall Islands Dose Assessment and Radioecology Program, reported that "Conditions have really changed on Bikini. They are improving at an accelerated rate. By using the combined option of removing soil and adding potassium, we can get very close to the 15 millirem standard. That has been true for roughly the past 10 years. So now is the time when the Bikinians, if they desired, could go back."

, about 4,880 Bikini people live on Kili and other Marshall Islands, and some have emigrated to the United States. Bikini Island is currently visited by a few scientists and inhabited by 4–6 caretakers.
The islanders want the topsoil removed, but lack the necessary funding. The opportunity for some Bikini islanders to potentially relocate back to their home island creates a dilemma. While the island may be habitable in the near term, virtually all of the islanders alive today have never lived there. Most of the younger generation have never visited. , unemployment in the Marshall Islands was at about 40 percent. The population is growing at a four-percent growth rate, so increasing numbers are taking advantage of terms in the Marshall Islands' Compact of Free Association that allow them to obtain jobs in the United States.

After the islanders were relocated in 1946, while the Bikini islanders were experiencing starvation on Rongerik Atoll, Lore Kessibuki wrote an anthem for the island:

 No longer can I stay, it’s true
 No longer can I live in peace and harmony
 No longer can I rest on my sleeping mat and pillow
 Because of my island and the life I once knew there
 The thought is overwhelming
 Rendering me helpless and in great despair.

In popular culture

Cinema 
 The documentary Bikini – mon amour by Oliver Herbrich shows the effects of long-term low-level radiation on the population.
 The 1962 Italian mondo documentary film Mondo Cane shows the effects of long-term low-level radiation on the wildlife.

Television shows 
The Nickelodeon animated series SpongeBob SquarePants primarily takes place in Bikini Bottom, which is supposedly situated underneath the atoll named after Bikini Atoll.

During an interview with Tom Kenny, the voice actor for SpongeBob, he was asked about the popular theory that SpongeBob is the result of nuclear testing. To this he said,

Swimsuit design 

On 5 July 1946, four days after the first nuclear device (nicknamed Able) was detonated over the Bikini Atoll during Operation Crossroads, Louis Réard introduced a new swimsuit design named the bikini after the atoll. Réard was a French mechanical engineer by training and manager of his mother's lingerie shop in Paris. He introduced the new garment to the media and public on 5 July 1946 at Piscine Molitor, a public pool in Paris.

He hired Micheline Bernardini, an 18-year-old nude dancer from the Casino de Paris, to demonstrate his design. Bernardini received 50,000 fan letters, many of them from men. Réard hoped that his swimsuit's revealing style would create an "explosive commercial and cultural reaction" similar in intensity to the social reaction to 1946 nuclear explosion at Bikini Atoll. Fashion writer Diana Vreeland described the bikini as the "atom bomb of fashion".

Because the bikini exposes a woman's thighs and shoulders, it violates the Marshall Islanders' modern customs of modesty, whereas cultural taboos regarding women's breasts are less strict on the islands. Marshall Island women swim in their muumuus, which are made of a fine polyester that dries quickly. Wearing a bikini in the Marshall Islands is mainly limited to restricted-access beaches and pools like those at private resorts or on United States government facilities on Kwajalein Atoll within the Ronald Reagan Ballistic Missile Defense Test Site.

Gallery

See also 

 Operation Castle
 Operation Ivy
 Radio Bikini
 Wōdejebato

References

Notes

Bibliography 

 Niedenthal, Jack, For the Good of Mankind: A History of the People of Bikini and their Islands, Bravo Publishers, (November 2002), 
 Wiesgall, Jonathan M, Operation Crossroads: Atomic Tests at Bikini Atoll, Naval Institute Press (21 April 1994),

External links 

 A Short History of the People of Bikini Atoll
 What About Radiation on Bikini Atoll?
 Department of Energy Marshall Islands Program: Chronology of nuclear testing, relocation of islanders and results of radiation tests
 Annotated bibliography for Bikini Atoll from the Alsos Digital Library for Nuclear Issues
 Islanders Want The Truth About Bikini Nuclear Test
 Marshall Islands site
 
 Everything Marshall Islands
 Lauren R. Donaldson Collection, served as a radiation monitor for Operation Crossroads; the codename for the first atomic bomb tests at Bikini Atoll. – University of Washington Digital Collection
 The Archeology of the Atomic Bomb A Submerged Cultural Resources Assessment of the Sunken Fleet of Operation Crossroads at Bikini and Kwajalein Atoll Lagoons U.S. National Park Service

 
Atolls of the Marshall Islands
Ralik Chain
World Heritage Sites in the Marshall Islands
American nuclear test sites
Nuclear test sites